The Rolls-Royce Museum is a privately owned automobile museum in Dornbirn, Vorarlberg, Austria. Established in 1982, and officially opened to the public in 1999, it has been said to have the world's largest collection of Rolls-Royce cars.

In 2017, the museum's founder, Franz Vonier, died, and the local city and state decided to cease subsidising the museum's rent payments. The founder's successors, Bernhard and Johannes Vonier, therefore moved the museum to a smaller building nearby that they owned themselves.

With less space available in the smaller building, the museum now focuses on its more special exhibits, and plans to present a new theme each year. The museum's permanent collection is made up of over 1,000 objects, including around 70 cars.

Highlights from the permanent exhibition include:

 1927 Phantom I, driven by Peter O’Toole in Lawrence of Arabia
 1927 Phantom I, owned by General Franco
 1932 Phantom II, driven by Rita Hayworth
 1936 Phantom III, owned by Queen Elizabeth

See also
List of automobile museums

References

External links

Rolls-Royce Museum – official site 

Automobile museums in Austria
Dornbirn
Museums in Vorarlberg
Rolls-Royce